A to Zap! Featuring the Sunbuddies is an educational video game by American studio ImageBuilder Software released in 1995 for Windows and Macintosh.

References 

1995 video games
Educational video games
Classic Mac OS games
Video games developed in the United States
Windows games